Alexey Lyalko (born ) is a Kazakhstani former road track cyclist. He competed in the team pursuit event at the 2012 UCI Track Cycling World Championships.

Major results
2005
 5th Grand Prix of Moscow
2008
 1st Overall Cycling Golden Jersey
 5th International Grand Prix Losail
 8th International Grand Prix Doha
2011
 1st Stage 1 Tour of Azerbaijan (Iran)
2012
 10th Overall Tour of East Java

References

External links
 Profile at cyclingarchives.com

1985 births
Living people
Kazakhstani track cyclists
Kazakhstani male cyclists
Place of birth missing (living people)
Cyclists at the 2006 Asian Games
Cyclists at the 2010 Asian Games
Asian Games medalists in cycling
Asian Games silver medalists for Kazakhstan
Medalists at the 2006 Asian Games
21st-century Kazakhstani people